CPS II may refer to any of the following.

CP System II, an arcade system board developed by Capcom
Carbamoyl phosphate synthase II, a catalyzing enzyme